William Crawford may refer to:

Entertainment
 William Broderick Crawford (1911–1986), American film actor
 Bill Crawford (cartoonist) (1913–1982), American editorial cartoonist
 William L. Crawford (1911–1984), U.S. publisher and editor
 William Crawford (knight), character in epic poem about Scottish knight William Wallace

Military
 William Crawford (soldier) (1732–1782), soldier in American Revolution, burnt at the stake by Native Americans
 William Lyne Crawford (1839–1920), American Confederate soldier and lawyer
 William J. Crawford (1918–2000), American soldier and Medal of Honor recipient
 William Crawford (Royal Navy officer) (1907–2003), British admiral

Politics
 William Crawford (Pennsylvania politician) (1760–1823), American Representative from Pennsylvania
 William Crawford (Virginia politician) (died 1762), politician in Virginia House of Burgesses, founder of Portsmouth, Virginia
 William H. Crawford (1772–1834), U.S. Secretary of War and Secretary of the Treasury
 William T. Crawford (1856–1913), U.S. Representative from North Carolina
 Bill Crawford (Indiana politician) (1936–2015), Democrat in Indiana House of Representatives
 William Sharman Crawford (1781–1861), Irish MP
 William Crawford (London MP) (1780–1843), British MP for the City of London, 1833–1841
 William Crawford (trade unionist) (1833–1890), British MP for Mid Durham, 1885–1890
 William Fitzgerald Crawford (1844–1915), New Zealand mayor
 William Crawford (Canadian politician) (1847–1897), Canadian surveyor and politician in Manitoba
 William A. Crawford (1915–2001), U.S. Ambassador to Romania
 William R. Crawford Jr. (1928–2002), US ambassador to Yemen and Cyprus

Sports
 William James Crawford (active 1906–1937), British sports photographer
 Bill Crawford (footballer) (1872–1955), English pro footballer
 William Ernie Crawford (1891–1959), Irish rugby union player
 Bill Crawford (American football) (born 1937), Canadian player of American football

Other
 William Crawford (judge) (1784–1849), United States federal judge
 William Crawford (artist) (1822–1869), Scottish painter
 William Monod Crawford (1872–1941), Irish colonial civil servant in India and entomologist

See also 
 William Bill Crawford-Compton (1915–1988), New Zealand-born pilot
 Bill Crawford (comedian) (born 1979), American comedian and radio personality
 Billy Crawford (born 1982), Filipino-American musician and actor
 Wille Crafoord (born 1966), Swedish composer and singer
 William Crawford & Sons, former British biscuit company
 Willie Crawford (1946–2004), American Major League Baseball player